Rokiciny-Kolonia  is a village in the administrative district of Gmina Rokiciny, within Tomaszów Mazowiecki County, Łódź Voivodeship, in central Poland.

The village has a population of 1,300.

References

Villages in Tomaszów Mazowiecki County